TEDxAuckland is an independent TEDx event held annually in Auckland, New Zealand. Like other TEDx events, the event obtained a free license from TED to hold the conference, with organizers agreeing to follow certain principles.  In May 2016, TEDxAuckland hosted 28 speakers at the Shed 10 venue on the waterfront in Auckland.

History

TEDxAuckland was founded as an independent TEDx event by producer Elliott Blade.

The fourth edition was held in August 2013, with speakers scheduled such as local cook Robert Oliver. Blade continued to organize, stating the previous event in 2012 had been sold out. The August 2013 version featured performances by artists such as Samoan hip-hop artist King Kapisi, poet Grace Taylor, singer-songwriters Joseph and Maia, and the New Zealand String Quartet.

In May 2016, TEDxAuckland hosted 28 speakers at the Shed 10 venue on the waterfront in Auckland.

Events and speakers

2012

 Aakash Polra
 Andrew Patterson
 David Krofcheck
 Emma Rogan
 Jade Tan Swea Phin
 John Windsor
 Matthew Simmons
 Michelle Dickinson
 Paul Cameron
 Paul Wood
 Peter Young
 Philip Patston
 Pip Hall
 Victoria Spackman

2013

 Brian Sweeney
 Dale Williams
 David Trubridge
 Grace Taylor
 Helen Clark
 Jimi Hunt
 Joseph Micheal
 Lillian Grace
 Malcolm Rands
 Pete Russell
 Richard Faull
 Richard Nunns
 Robert Oliver
 Robyn Paterson
 Sophie Tauwehe Tamati
 Welby Ings

2014

 Catherine Bell
 Curtis Vowell
 David Downs
 John Boone
 Jon Bridges
 Luke Nola
 Matt Stone
 Mike Allsop
 Mohamed Hassan
 Muskan Devta
 Rachel Callander
 Rebecca Wadey
 Rebecca Mills
 Richard Easther
 Riley Elliott
 Sarah Longbottom
 Urzila Carlson
 Vaughan Rowsell
 Vivian Maidaborn
 Waikare Komene
 Willie Jackson

2015

 Bailey Wiley
 Billie Jordan
 Bob Harvey
 Dale Nirvani Pfeifer
 Gavin Healy
 Grant Schofield
 Hip Op-eration
 Dr. Hong Sheng Chiong
 Janette Searle
 Lisa Matisoo-Smith
 Max Cryer
 Michel Tuffery
 Riley and Steve Hathaway
 Siouxsie Wiles
 Shaun Hendy
 Sorceress Soundsystem
 Steve Pointing
 Tame Iti
 Tom Scott

2016

 Adrien Taylor
 Alison Mau
 Anna Coddington
 Barbara Breen
 Cori Gonzalez-Macuer
 David Harvey
 Georgia Lala
 Grace Clapham
 Ian McCrae
 James Bergin
 Jayne Bailey
 Jess Holly Bates
 Joseph Driessen
 Keith Ng
 Lizzie Marvelly
 Matt Shirtcliffe
 Megan May
 Michael Moka
 Minnie Baragwanath
 Modern Māori Quartet
 Pani Farvid
 Richard Aston
 Richard Little
 Rory Steyn
 Samuel Gibson
 Solonia Teodros
 Toby Carr
 Vaughan Rowsell

See also

 Culture of New Zealand

References

External links 
 TEDxAuckland

Culture in Auckland
Organisations based in Auckland
Auckland